Christophe Moulin, born 1967 is a French television presenter. He presents Sans aucun doute by TF1, having taken over from Julien Courbet on 12 September 2008. He was previously a journalist and editor-in-chief with LCI, as well as the head of the Police and Justice department of LCI. He started working at LCI in 1994. He presented two weekly shows: one legal "Preuves à l'appui" and one political "Politoscopie". A graduate of the École supérieure de journalisme, he also worked for the TPS Star and 13ème rue television stations, as well as for Radio France.

References 

French television presenters
Living people
1967 births